Miss Earth Ecuador (Miss Tierra Ecuador) is one of the official preliminaries to the international Miss Earth beauty pageant, which was established in the Philippines in 2001. The pageant focuses mainly on promoting environmental causes and winners are chosen equally on their physical attributes as well as their understanding and knowledge of the issues affecting the Earth.

History
Ecuador made a debut in Miss Earth 2003. Ecuador's representatives to Miss Earth, an annual international beauty pageant promoting environmental awareness, are elected and organized by Diosas Escuela de Misses under the directorship of Jose Hidalgo.

In 2005, Cristina Reyes was among the 16 semi-finalists in the Miss Earth 2005 competition, the first time that Ecuador has entered the top 16 in Miss Earth. Andrea Leon, Miss Earth Ecuador 2008 won the Miss Friendship special award in the Miss Earth 2008. Leon was also included in the top 15 of the swimsuit competition, she placed fourth in the evening gown competition, and finalist in the talent competition. Jennifer Pazmiño made the highest placement for Ecuador in Miss Earth when she won the Miss Air 2010, one of the elemental court of Miss Earth. She was dethroned later that year when she chose to get married. Viktoria Shchukina from Russia took over the title as Miss Air 2010. Finally Ecuador won its first Miss Earth title the following year, in the person of Olga Alava.

In February 2018, Katherine Espin, who won the second Miss Earth crown for Ecuador was appointed as the National Director of Miss Earth Ecuador Organization.

Titleholders
The following is the list of Miss Ecuador Earth titleholders: 

In 2010 edition, Jennifer Pazmiño from Ecuador resigned. Viktoria Shchukina from Russia took over the title as Miss Air 2010.
In 2012 edition, Estefanía Realpe from Pichincha was dethroned. Tatiana Torres from Azuay took over the title as Miss Earth Ecuador 2012.

Provincial rankings

See also
Miss Ecuador
Miss World Ecuador
Miss Teen Ecuador
Mister Ecuador

References

External links
 Miss Ecuador Earth website

Ecuador
Beauty pageants in Ecuador
Ecuadorian awards